Thomas Bateman Bushby (December 30, 1911 – October 23, 1983) was a professional football player for the Cincinnati "Football" Reds in 1934 and the Philadelphia Eagles in 1935. After playing for the Eagles, he played from 1936 to 1938 for the Salinas Iceberg Packers, a professional league team in Salinas, California.

Biography
Bushby was born in Munden, Kansas and played football at Kansas State University under Bo McMillin.

References

1911 births
1983 deaths
Cincinnati Reds (NFL) players
Kansas State Wildcats football players
People from Republic County, Kansas
Philadelphia Eagles players